The Capture of Shimoga, a town and fortress held by forces of the Kingdom of Mysore, occurred on 3 January 1792, after a preliminary battle with the attacking forces of the British East India Company and the Marathas, not far from the town on 29 December, had scattered much of its defending army. The defenders surrendered after the fort's walls were breached. The battle was part of a campaign during the Third Anglo-Mysore War by Maratha leader Purseram Bhow to recover Maratha territories taken by Hyder Ali in an earlier conflict between Mysore and the Marathas. By the end of the siege, Reza Sahib a leading Mysore commander, was among the captured.

References
Moor, Edward (1794). A narrative of the operations of captain Little's detachment, and of the Mahratta army (a detailed British account of the capture)
Mill, James. A history of British India, Volume 5
Duff, James Grant. A history of the Mahrattas, Volume 2

Shimoga
Shimoga
Shimoga 1791
Shimoga 1791
Shimoga 1791
Shimoga 1791
Military history of India
1792 in India